Susan W. Coates (born 1940) is an American psychoanalyst, who has worked on gender identity disorder in children (GIDC) and early childhood trauma.

Career
Coates earned her B.A. from Sarah Lawrence College, her M.A. from Vassar College, and her Ph.D. in clinical psychology from New York University. She is a Clinical Professor of Psychology in Psychiatry at the College of Physicians and Surgeons of Columbia University.

In the 1970s, Coates developed the Preschool Embedded Figures Test, which she developed based on Herman Witkin's Embedded Figures Test to study field dependence-independence (FDI). This led to work on cognitive and behavioral sex differences in humans.

Coates was Director of the Childhood Gender Identity Service at St. Luke's–Roosevelt Hospital Center from 1980 to 1997. She served on the American Psychiatric Association DSM-IV Subcommittee on Gender Identity Disorders. She is on the teaching faculty of the Columbia University Center for Psychoanalytic Training and Research. She is also on the faculty of the Division of Sexuality and Gender in the Psychiatry Department of Columbia University. In 1997, Coates was founding co-director of the Parent-Infant Program at the center. She is the senior editor of the 2003 book September 11: Trauma and Human Bonds, an account of 9/11 related loss and trauma described by mental health professionals who also experienced the attacks and their aftermath.

Coates was a critic of Woody Allen's influence on his son Satchel after the Allen–Mia Farrow trial. She had treated Satchel between 1990 and 1992.

After the September 11, 2001 attacks, Coates provided mental health services to children and their parents at the Family Assistance Center set up by Disaster Psychiatry Outreach at Pier 94 in New York City.

She is the recipient of the "Margaret S Mahler award for outstanding papers in child psychoanalysis", the George E. Daniels Award of Merit from The Columbia Center for Psychoanalytic Training and Research for "distinguished contribution to psychoanalysis", and is the Recipient of the American Psychoanalytic Association "2016 JAPA Prize Award for excellence in psychoanalytic scholarship and distinguished contributions to the journal".

Selected publications

Coates SW (1985). Extreme boyhood femininity: Overview and new research findings. In Ruth Corn, Zira DeFries, Richard C. Friedman, eds. Sexuality: New perspectives. Greenwood Press 
Coates SW, Person ES (1986). Extreme Boyhood Femininity: Isolated Behavior or Pervasive Disorder? J Am Acad Child Psychiatry. 1985 Nov;24(6):702–9.
Coates SW (1990). Ontogenesis of Boyhood Gender Identity Disorder. J. Amer. Acad. Psychoanal., 18:414–438.
Coates SW, Friedman RC, Wolfe S (1991). The Etiology of Boyhood Gender Identity Disorder: A Model for Integrating Temperament, Development, and Psychodynamics. Psychoanal. Dial., 1:481–523.
Zucker KJ, Green R, Coates S, Zuger B, Cohen-Kettenis PT, Zecca GM, Lertora V, Money J, Hahn-Burke S, Bradley SJ, Blanchard R. Sibling sex ratio of boys with gender identity disorder. J Child Psychol Psychiatry. 1997 Jul;38(5):543–51.
Coates SW, Wolfe S. Boyhood Gender Identity Disorder: The interface of constitution and early experience. Psychoanalytic Inquiry, 1995, 51:6–38.
Coates SW, Moore MS. The complexity of early trauma: Representation and transformation. Psychoanalytic Inquiry, 1997, 17:286–311.
Coates SW, Schechter, DS, First, E, Anzieu-Premmereur, C, Steinberg, Z, & Hamilton, V. Considerazioni in merito all’intervento di crisi con I bambini di New York City dopo l’attentato alle Torri Gemelle. (Thoughts on Crisis Intervention with New York City Children After the World Trade Center Bombing). Infanzia E Adolescenza, 2002, 1:49–62.
Coates SW, Schechter DS, First E, Anzieu-Premmereur C, Steinberg Z, Hamilton V. Quelques reflexions sur les interventions immediates apres des enfants de New York apres la tragedie du World Trade Center. Psychotherapies, 2002, 22, 143–152. Geneve.
Schechter DS, Coates SW, First E (2002). Observations of acute reactions of young children and their families to the World Trade Center attacks. Journal of ZERO-TO-THREE: National Center for Infants, Toddlers, and Families, 22(3), 9–13.
Schechter DS, Coates SW, First F (2003). Beobachtungen von akuten Reaktionen kleiner Kinder und ihrer Familien auf die Anschläge auf das World Trade Center. In T. Auchter, C. Buettner, U. Schultz-Venrath, H.-J. Wirth (Eds.): Der 11. September. Psychoanalytische, psychosoziale und psychohistorische Analysen von Terror und Trauma. Giessen, Germany: Psychosozial-Verlag. pp. 268–280.
Coates SW, Schechter DS, First E, Anzieu-Premmereur C, Steinberg Z, Hamilton V. L'experience d'une equipe therapeutique de Columbia aupres des enfants de New York apres le 11 Septembre. Carnet Psy, Mai 2002, 73, 19–21. Clinical examples of crisis interventions with New York City families after September 11.
Coates SW, Rosenthal J, Schechter DS, eds. (2003). September 11: Trauma and Human Bonds. Hillside, NJ : The Analytic Press. 
Coates SW, Schechter DS. 2004. Preschoolers' Traumatic Stress Post-9/11: Relational and Developmental Perspectives. In. Psychiatric Clinics of North America. Disaster Psychiatry: A Closer Look. Edited by Craig Katz, M.D. and Anand Pandya, M.D. 27, 3, 473–489.
Coates SW (2005). Having a Mind of One's Own and Holding the Other in Mind: Commentary on Paper by Peter Fonagy and Mary Target (1998). Mahwah, NJ: Analytic Press.
Schechter DS, Coots T, Zeanah CH, Davies M, Coates SW, Trabka KA, et al. (2005). Maternal mental representations of the child in an inner-city clinical sample: Violence-related posttraumatic stress and reflective functioning. Attachment & Human Development, 7(3), 313–331.
Schechter DS, Coates SW (2006). Relationally and developmentally focused interventions with young children and their caregivers affected by the events of 9/11. In Y. Neria, R. Gorss, R. D. Marshall & E. Susser (Eds.), September 11, 2001: Treatment, Research and Public Mental Health in the Wake of a Terrorist Attack (pp. 402–427). New York: Cambridge University Press.
Schechter DS, Myers MM, Brunelli SA, Coates SW, Zeanah CH Jr, Davies M, et al. (2006). Traumatized mothers can change their minds about their toddlers: Understanding how a novel use of videofeedback supports positive change of maternal attributions. Infant Mental Health Journal, 27(5), 429–447.
Schechter DS, Zygmunt A, Coates SW, Davies M, Trabka KA, McCaw J, et al. (2007). Caregiver traumatization adversely impacts young children's mental representations on the MacArthur Story Stem Battery. Attachment & Human Development, 9(3), 187–205.
Coates SW, Gaensbauer TJ. 2009. Event Trauma in Early Childhood: Symptoms, Assessment, Intervention. Child and Adolescent Psychiatric Clinics of North America Infant and Early Childhood Mental Health. Editors are Mary Margaret Gleason and Daniel S. Schechter. 18(3):611–26.
Coates, SW. 2016. Can Babies Remember Trauma? Symbolic Forms of Representation in Traumatized Infants. Journal of the American Psychoanalytic Association. August 2016 64: 751–776.

References

External links
Columbia University Center for Psychoanalytic Training and Research
Trauma in Children; Considerations for Care After Hurricane Katrina: An Expert Interview With Susan Coates, PhD via MedScape
Susan Coates profile via CUNY
Clinical/Epidemiological Developmental Research via Sackler Institute for Developmental Psychobiology
Special Members roster via Association for Psychoanalytic Medicine

American women psychologists
21st-century American psychologists
Sarah Lawrence College alumni
Vassar College alumni
New York University alumni
1940 births
Living people
21st-century American women
20th-century American psychologists